Guanyinqiao  is an interchange station on Line 3 and Line 9 of Chongqing Rail Transit in Chongqing Municipality, China. It is located in the Jiangbei District. It opened on 29 September 2011 with the opening of Line 3. On 25 January 2022, it became an interchange station with the opening of Line 9.

Nevertheless, due to the transfer passage is still under construction, all passengers transferring between the two lines at this station must exit the station first.

Station structure

Line 3

Line 9

References

Jiangbei District, Chongqing
Railway stations in Chongqing
Railway stations in China opened in 2011
Chongqing Rail Transit stations